Xu Gan (Chinese: 徐幹, pinyin Xú Gàn, 171–218), courtesy name Weichang ( 偉長), was a Chinese philosopher and poet of the late Eastern Han dynasty. He was also one of the "Seven Scholars of Jian'an". He is best known in the West for his discourse on the relationship between the names and actualities, preserved in his treatise Zhonglun (中論).

Life 
Born in Ju County, Beihai Commandery (east of present-day Lechang, Shandong), Xu Gan developed a reputation for good memory and diligent studies as a youth. Around 189, Xu Gan left his residence in Linzi and went into hiding on the Jiaodong peninsula.

Literature 
John Makeham, Name and Actuality in Early Chinese History. State University of New York Press, Albany, 1994.

Translations 
Balanced Discourses: a Bilingual Edition. English translation by John Makeham; Introductions by Dan Shengyuan and John Makeham. Yale University Press, 2002.

171 births
218 deaths
3rd-century Chinese philosophers
3rd-century Chinese poets
Han dynasty philosophers
Han dynasty poets
Philosophers from Shandong
Poets from Shandong
Seven scholars of Jian'an